Children Galore is a 1955 comedy film directed by Terence Fisher. It stars Eddie Byrne and June Thorburn. A village squire offers to give away a cottage to a deserving family with the most grandchildren.

Cast

 Eddie Byrne as Zacky Jones
 June Thorburn as Milly Ark
 Betty Ann Davies as Mrs. Ark
 Richard Leech as Harry Bunnion
 Marjorie Rhodes as Ada Jones
 Jack McNaughton as Pat Ark 
 Violet Gould as Mrs. Bunnion 
 Henry Caine as Bert Bunnion 
 Evan Thomas as Lord Redscarfe 
 Marjorie Hume as Lady Redscarfe 
 Lucy Griffiths as Miss Prescott
 Olive Milbourne as Miss Finch	
 Grace Arnold as Mrs. Gedge	
 Anna Turner as Louise	
 John Peters as Plumber	
 Jack Hartman as Mate	
 John Lothar as Postman	
 David Ludlow as Boy

Critical reception
In the Radio Times, David Parkinson rated the film two out of five stars, calling it "Fun in a very English sort of way, this programme filler has the advantage of being short and to the point."

References

External links
 

1955 films
Films directed by Terence Fisher
British comedy films
1955 comedy films
Films set in England
Films shot in East Sussex
1950s English-language films
1950s British films
British black-and-white films